The women's tournament of football at the 2011 Summer Universiade in China began on August 11 and ended on August 22.

Teams

Preliminary round

Group A

Group B

Group C

Classification 9th–12th Place

Knockout stage

Quarterfinals

Semifinals

Classification 5th–8th Place

Finals

7th-place match

5th-place match

Bronze-medal match

Final

Final standings

External links
Schedule
Reports

2011
Women
2011 in women's association football
International women's association football competitions hosted by China
2011 in Chinese women's sport